Lianhua County is a county in the west of Jiangxi province, China, bordering Hunan province to the west. It is the southernmost county-level division of the prefecture-level city of Pingxiang.

Geography
Lianhua lies in the Luoxiao Mountains, somewhat north of Jinggangshan.

Revolutionary History
Hard on the Hunan border, Lianhua was the headquarters of the (South-)Eastern Hunan Red Army Independent Division, and thus the administrative centre for the Hunan-Jiangxi Soviet, a constituent part of the Chinese Soviet Republic of the early 1930s.

Administrative divisions
Lianhua County has 5 towns and 8 townships.
5 towns

8 townships

Climate

References

External links

 
County-level divisions of Jiangxi